Freakin' Beautiful World is a 1997 Finnish drama film written and directed by Jarmo Lampela. The film is about two teenage boys from Helsinki who owe money to a local drug dealer. In order to pay their debt, they have to travel to Stockholm to collect drugs for the drug dealer.

The film won Jussi Awards for Best Film, Best Cinematography, and Best Editing.

Cast 
 Joonas Bragge as Ismo, "Ippe"
 Arttu Kapulainen as Pauli, "Papu"
 Pihla Penttinen as Mia
 Ilkka Koivula as Kalevi "Kalle" Lahtinen
 Kati Outinen as Tarja, Ippe's mother
 Jyri Ojansivu as Sami, Papu's brother
 Pekka Valkeejärvi as Esa, Papu's father
 Sakari Korhonen as Sakke, Ippe's father
 Irja Matikainen as Anita, Mia's mother

References

External links 
 
 

1990s teen drama films
Films about drugs
Films set in Helsinki
Films set in Stockholm
Films shot in Finland
1990s Finnish-language films
Finnish drama films
Finnish teen films
1997 drama films
1997 films